Kongsvegsåta is a mountain at Spitsbergen, Svalbard. It is located north of Kongsvegpasset, between Oscar II Land and Haakon VII Land, and has a height of 1,110 m.a.s.l.

References

Mountains of Spitsbergen